Thermosphaeroma dugesi is a species of isopod in the family Sphaeromatidae. It is found in Mexico.

The IUCN conservation status of Thermosphaeroma dugesi is "CR", critically endangered. The species faces an extremely high risk of extinction in the immediate future. The IUCN status was reviewed in 1996.

References

Sphaeromatidae
Articles created by Qbugbot
Crustaceans described in 1893